Glebe Center, also known as Glebe Shopping Center, is a historic shopping center located in the Ballston neighborhood of Arlington County, Virginia.  It was designed by noted Washington, D.C. architect Mihran Mesrobian and built in 1940.  It is a one-story, "L"-shaped cinder-block building with a flat parapet roof and clad in a six-course, American-bond brick veneer with cast-stone decorative accents.  It features large store-front windows, Art Deco decorative elements, and a central square tower surmounted by a glass-block clerestory capped by a pyramidal-shaped metal roof.  It was built to serve the residents of the Buckingham apartment complex and Ashton Heights, as well as the many motorists traveling along Arlington Boulevard and North Glebe Road.

It was listed on the National Register of Historic Places in 2004.

References

External links
Glebe Center, 71-89 North Glebe Road, Arlington, Arlington County, VA: 5 data pages at Historic American Buildings Survey

Commercial buildings on the National Register of Historic Places in Virginia
Art Deco architecture in Virginia
Commercial buildings completed in 1940
National Register of Historic Places in Arlington County, Virginia
Department stores on the National Register of Historic Places